Misfits Meet the Nutley Brass: Fiend Club Lounge is a tribute album to the American horror punk band Misfits, recorded by the Nutley Brass (who had previously recorded a tribute record to the Ramones) and released in 2005 by Misfits Records. It features cover versions of Misfits songs from the band's early era, 1977 to 1983, performed in an instrumental "lounge" or "space age pop" style.

Misfits bassist Jerry Only commented that "The Nutley Brass version of 'Die, Die My Darling' is swirling with 007 suspense like the soundtrack of an early James Bond movie. The horns seem to jet out like one of the old albums from the Tijuana Brass." Original Misfits guitarist Franché Coma remarked that "Fiend Club Lounge is one of the best renditions of some of the best Misfits songs ever recorded. Any true, and I mean true musician will appreciate the intricacies of the instrumentations on this CD. It takes punk music to a different level. It shows us how anything is possible if you want to make it happen. You'll think you are listening to a soundtrack from a big screen movie. A great lush theatrical feel."

Track listing

Personnel 
Produced, conducted, and engineered by Sam Elwitt
Executive Producers: John Cafiero and Jerry Only
Additional recording and engineering by Mitch Rackin
Vocalizations on "Teenagers from Mars" and "Some Kinda Hate" by Clare McKeen
Mastered by Alan Douches at West West Side Music
Artwork by Basil Gogos
Interior packaging layout and additional graphic design by Edward Odowd
Additional graphics by Paul Grosso
Front and back cover concept and art direction by John Cafiero

References

External links 
Nutley Brass official site

2005 albums
Misfits Records albums
Tribute albums
Lounge music albums
Space age pop albums
Horror punk compilation albums